Henry Oscar Murton, Baron Murton of Lindisfarne  (8 May 1914 – 5 July 2009) was a British Conservative Party politician.

Career

Murton was born in Newcastle-upon-Tyne and educated at Uppingham School. He joined the Territorial Army with a commission in the Northumberland Fusiliers in 1934. He was promoted to Lieutenant in 1937 and to Captain in 1939. He was a Lieutenant-Colonel in the General Staff from 1942 to 1946. He later became a managing director of department stores.

Murton was Member of Parliament for Poole from 1964 to 1979, preceding John Ward.  Murton was a government whip under Edward Heath and later a Deputy Speaker of the House of Commons from 1973 to 1979.  He was appointed as a Privy Counsellor in 1976, and after his retirement from the House of Commons at the 1979 general election, he was given a life peerage as Baron Murton of Lindisfarne, of Hexham in the County of Northumberland on 25 July 1979.

Arms

References

Times Guide to the House of Commons October 1974

External links 
 

1914 births
2009 deaths
British Army personnel of World War II
Murton of Lindisfarne
Conservative Party (UK) MPs for English constituencies
Deputy Speakers of the British House of Commons
Members of the Privy Council of the United Kingdom
Officers of the Order of the British Empire
People educated at Uppingham School
Royal Northumberland Fusiliers officers
UK MPs 1964–1966
UK MPs 1966–1970
UK MPs 1970–1974
UK MPs 1974
UK MPs 1974–1979
Life peers created by Elizabeth II